John E. Griesheimer (born July 19, 1952, Saint Clair, Missouri) is a Republican politician from Missouri.  He is a former Missouri State Representative, a former Missouri State Senator, a former Franklin County Commissioner and a former Franklin County Presiding Commissioner.

Family
He currently resides with his wife, Rita Maune, in Washington, Missouri. They have three children Sean (wife Rachel), Aaron (wife Amanda), and Michelle.

Career
He graduated from East Central College in Union, Missouri. He started his political career as a member of the Washington city council (1982–1988). He went on to serve in the Franklin County, Missouri, commission (1989–1992), the Missouri House of Representatives (1992–2002), the Missouri State Senate (2002–2010) and as Franklin County Presiding Commissioner (2010-2018).

References
Official Manual, State of Missouri, 2005-2006.  Jefferson City, MO: Secretary of State.

1952 births
Republican Party members of the Missouri House of Representatives
Republican Party Missouri state senators
People from Washington, Missouri
Living people